The 2020–21 UEFA Champions League group stage began on 20 October 2020 and ended on 9 December 2020. A total of 32 teams competed in the group stage to decide the 16 places in the knockout phase of the 2020–21 UEFA Champions League.

Krasnodar, Midtjylland, İstanbul Başakşehir and Rennes made their debut appearances in the group stage. Istanbul is the first city providing 4 teams for group stage. This season is also the first in Champions League history to three Russian teams qualifying to group stages.

Draw
The draw was held at the RTS Studios in Geneva, Switzerland on 1 October 2020 at 17:00 CEST.

The 32 teams were drawn into eight groups of four, with the restriction that teams from the same association could not be drawn against each other. For the draw, the teams were seeded into four pots based on the following principles (Regulations Article 13.06):

 Pot 1 contained the Champions League and Europa League title holders, and the champions of the top six associations based on their 2019 UEFA country coefficients. As the Champions League title holders, Bayern Munich, were also the champions of their association, the champions of the next highest ranked association, Portugal, were also seeded into Pot 1.
 Pots 2, 3 and 4 contained the remaining teams, seeded based on their 2020 UEFA club coefficients.

On 17 July 2014, the UEFA emergency panel ruled that Ukrainian and Russian clubs would not be drawn against each other "until further notice" due to the political unrest between the countries.

Moreover, for associations with two or more teams, teams were paired in order to split them into two sets of four groups (A–D, E–H) for maximum television coverage. The following pairings were announced by UEFA after the group stage teams were confirmed:

 A  Bayern Munich and Borussia Dortmund
 B  Sevilla and Atlético Madrid
 C  Real Madrid and Barcelona
 D  Liverpool and Manchester United
 E  Juventus and Inter Milan
 F  Paris Saint-Germain and Marseille
 G  Zenit Saint Petersburg and Lokomotiv Moscow
 H  Manchester City and Chelsea
 I  Shakhtar Donetsk and Dynamo Kyiv
 J  RB Leipzig and Borussia Mönchengladbach
 K  Lazio and Atalanta

On each matchday, one set of four groups played their matches on Tuesday, while the other set of four groups played their matches on Wednesday, with the two sets of groups alternating between each matchday. The fixtures were decided after the draw, using a computer draw not shown to public, with the following match sequence (Regulations Article 16.02):[2]

There were scheduling restrictions: for example, teams from the same city (e.g. Real Madrid & Atlético Madrid and Manchester City & Manchester United) in general were not scheduled to play at home on the same matchday (to avoid them playing at home on the same day or on consecutive days, due to logistics and crowd control), and teams from "winter countries" (e.g. Russia) were not scheduled to play at home on the last matchday (due to cold weather).

Teams
Below were the participating teams (with their 2020 UEFA club coefficients), grouped by their seeding pot. They included:
26 teams which entered in this stage
6 winners of the play-off round (4 from Champions Path, 2 from League Path)

Notes

Format
In each group, teams played against each other home-and-away in a round-robin format. The group winners and runners-up advanced to the round of 16, while the third-placed teams entered the Europa League round of 32.

Tiebreakers
Teams were ranked according to points (3 points for a win, 1 point for a draw, 0 points for a loss). If two or more teams were tied on points, the following tiebreaking criteria were applied, in the order given, to determine the rankings (see Article 17 Equality of points – group stage, Regulations of the UEFA Champions League):
Points in head-to-head matches among the tied teams;
Goal difference in head-to-head matches among the tied teams;
Goals scored in head-to-head matches among the tied teams;
Away goals scored in head-to-head matches among the tied teams;
If more than two teams were tied, and after applying all head-to-head criteria above, a subset of teams are still tied, all head-to-head criteria above were reapplied exclusively to this subset of teams;
Goal difference in all group matches;
Goals scored in all group matches;
Away goals scored in all group matches;
Wins in all group matches;
Away wins in all group matches;
Disciplinary points (direct red card = 3 points; double yellow card = 3 points; single yellow card = 1 point);
UEFA club coefficient.

Groups
The matchdays were 20–21 October, 27–28 October, 3–4 November, 24–25 November, 1–2 December, and 8–9 December 2020. The scheduled kickoff times were 21:00 CET/CEST, with two matches on each Tuesday and Wednesday scheduled for 18:55 CET/CEST.

Times were CET/CEST, as listed by UEFA (local times, if different, are in parentheses).

Group A

Group B

Group C

Group D

Group E

Group F

Group G

Group H

Notes

References

External links

Fixtures and Results, 2020–21, UEFA.com

Group Stage
2020-21
October 2020 sports events in Europe
November 2020 sports events in Europe
December 2020 sports events in Europe